"A Place Like This" is a song by Canadian R&B duo Majid Jordan. The song was released as the lead single and is the title track from their debut EP A Place Like This.

Release
The song was released on July 7, 2014 through SoundCloud. It was released as the lead single from their debut EP A Place Like This.

Music video
The music video was released on July 7, 2014 on YouTube, it was directed by Jamie Webster of Common Good. The introspective visuals take fans through one woman's journey through a steamy, sexy party— inter cut with appearances from the duo. The aforementioned woman moves from party goer to party goer as she searches for love and eventually finds it by the end of the video, as she gives the object of her affection a time that he will never forget. Or wake up from.

Track listing

Personnel

 Majid Jordan – primary artist

Release history

References

External links
 

2014 debut singles
2014 songs
Majid Jordan songs
OVO Sound singles
Song recordings produced by Majid Jordan
Songs written by Jordan Ullman
Songs written by Majid Al Maskati
Warner Records singles